William Damaschke (born November 20, 1963) is the former President of Animation and Family Entertainment for Skydance Media, where he served as the key architect setting the overall creative direction and strategy for Skydance. In conjunction with the company's feature film and television division, he curated and oversaw a team dedicated to producing a bold and original slate of both animated and hybrid family programming. Previously, he had spent 20 years at DreamWorks Animation, most recently as Chief Creative Officer, where he was involved in the creative, artistic, and operational direction of the company. His tenure oversaw the release of some of the company's big franchise films, including Madagascar, Kung Fu Panda, How to Train Your Dragon and The Croods. He also oversaw all of DreamWorks's live theatrical productions, including the award-winning Shrek the Musical.  Damaschke’s other projects as a producer include the Broadway musical The Prom, directed and choreographed by Casey Nicholaw, which played at the Longacre Theatre from 15 November 2018 to 11 August 2019; the Broadway-bound musical Half Time, directed and choreographed by Jerry Mitchell, which was presented at the Paper Mill Playhouse in Spring of 2018; and the stage adaptation of Moulin Rouge, directed by Alex Timers, on which Damaschke serves as executive producer.

Early life
Damaschke is the oldest of seven children, and grew up in Chicago. He attended St. Bruno Catholic Elementary and Argo Community High School, and graduated at the School of Theatre Arts at Illinois Wesleyan University.

Professional career
Initially, Damaschke pursued a career in musical theater, working on Godspell in New York, but soon ended up in Los Angeles as a production assistant on Disney's Pocahontas in 1994. In 1995, he joined DreamWorks Studios as a production assistant on The Prince of Egypt. He then moved on to become head of creative production in 1999 and head of creative production and development in 2005. Damaschke served as a producer of Shark Tale (nominated for an Academy Award for Best Animated Feature in 2004) and an executive producer of Over the Hedge and Kung Fu Panda. In 2011, he became chief creative officer (CCO) of DreamWorks Animation, running "the factory floor, working with directors, writers and artists," and "calling the creative shots". He was also president of DreamWorks Live Theatricals, and produced Tony Award-winning, but financially unremarkable, Shrek the Musical. In 2013, The New York Times called him "one of the film industry's most important executives". In January 2015, Damaschke stepped down from his position as Chief Creative Officer at DreamWorks to pursue other interests including: theatrical productions; animated television movies, web series, and live action films. In October 2017, he became the president of Animation and Family Entertainment for Skydance Media. He would also continue operating his StoryKey Entertainment theatrical production company. On February 9, 2023, Warner Animation Group is in talks about him to lead after the departure of Allison Abbate.

Personal life
Damaschke lives with John McIlwee, a top Hollywood business manager, in Hollywood Hills, in a 1962 house designed by John Lautner, which they bought in 2002 for $1.3 million and renovated for an additional $1 million.

Filmography

Producer

Actor

References

External links
 
 Illinois Wesleyan University Bio

American film producers
American television producers
American male film actors
Living people
LGBT film producers
LGBT television producers
LGBT people from Illinois
DreamWorks Animation people
1963 births